Jefferson Township is one of thirteen townships in Washington County, Indiana, United States. As of the 2010 census, its population was 920 and it contained 451 housing units.

Geography

Unincorporated towns
 Haleysbury at 
 McKinley at 
 Prowsville at 
 Rush Creek Valley at 
(This list is based on USGS data and may include former settlements.)

Adjacent townships
 Carr Township, Jackson County (north)
 Driftwood Township, Jackson County (northeast)
 Monroe Township (east)
 Washington Township (southeast)
 Vernon Township (southwest)
 Brown Township (west)

Cemeteries
The township contains these four cemeteries: Covenanter, Pollock, Thompson and Wheeler.

Lakes
 John Hays Lake

School districts
 Salem Community Schools

Political districts
 Indiana's 9th congressional district
 State House District 62
 State Senate District 44

References
 United States Census Bureau 2007 TIGER/Line Shapefiles
 United States Board on Geographic Names (GNIS)
 IndianaMap

External links
 Indiana Township Association
 United Township Association of Indiana

Townships in Washington County, Indiana
Townships in Indiana